The 2015 African Games men's football tournament qualification decided the participating teams of the 2015 African Games men's football tournament. A total of eight teams qualified to play in the men's football tournament, including Congo who qualified automatically as hosts. Both the qualifying rounds and the final tournament were age-restricted and open to men's under-23 national teams only.

Teams
A total of 24 teams entered the qualifying rounds, organized by the Confederation of African Football (CAF).

Format
Qualification ties were played on a home-and-away two-legged basis. If the aggregate score was tied after the second leg, the away goals rule would be applied, and if still level, the penalty shoot-out would be used to determine the winner (no extra time would be played).

The seven winners of the second round qualified for the final tournament.

Schedule
The schedule of the qualifying rounds was as follows.

Qualification rounds

First round

|}

Note: Libya, Guinea-Bissau, Madagascar, Tunisia and Swaziland withdrew.

Burkina Faso won on walkover.

Ivory Coast won on walkover.

Burundi won 2–1 on aggregate.

Egypt won 4–1 on aggregate.

Nigeria won 6–1 on aggregate.

Zambia won on walkover.

Mali won on walkover.

0–0 on aggregate. Mozambique won on penalties.

Zimbabwe won on walkover.

Sudan won 4–1 on aggregate.

Second round
Winners qualified for 2015 African Games.

|}

Burkina Faso won 2–1 on aggregate.

Egypt won 4–0 on aggregate.

Nigeria won 2–1 on aggregate.

3–3 on aggregate. Senegal won on away goals.

Ghana won 2–1 on aggregate.

Zimbabwe won 2–1 on aggregate.

Sudan won 2–1 on aggregate.

Qualified teams
The following eight teams qualified for the final tournament.

1 Bold indicates champion for that year. Italic indicates host for that year.

On 26 August 2015, the CAF announced that Egypt had withdrawn from the competition. Burundi, the team eliminated by Egypt in the final round, declined to replace them due to short notice. Therefore, only seven teams competed in the final tournament.

Goalscorers
4 goals
 Kahraba

3 goals

 Junior Ajayi
 Maher Osman

2 goals
 Taiwo Awoniyi

1 goal

 Faïçal Ouédraogo
 Allassane Sango
 Abbas Nshimirimana
 Fiston Abdul Razak
 Brice Tchamabo
 Katalay Ipumbu
 Mostafa Fathi
 Ramy Rabia
 Mohamed Salem
 Trezeguet
 Dawa Hotessa
 Axel Méyé
 Bright Adjei
 Cédric Khaleb Kouadio
 Vincent Omumbo
 Alou Badra Sylla
 Abdramane Traoré
 Sidi Yaya Traoré
 Salomão
 Segun Oduduwa
 Etebo Oghenekaro
 Peter Onyekachi
 Elhadji Pape Diaw
 Moussa Koné
 Ousseynou Thiouné
 Menzi Masuku
 Athar El Tahir
 Ibrahim Gaafar
 Mohamed Mukhtar
 Friday Samu
 Blessing Moyo
 Wisdom Mutasa

Own goal
 Salomão (playing against Ghana)

See also
Football at the 2015 African Games – Women's qualification

References

External links
African Games Men 2015, Qualifiers, CAFonline.com
Season at futbol24.com

Men's Qualification
2015
African Games - Men's Qualification